A circuit breaker is an automatic electrical switch.

Circuit breaker or circuit breakers may also refer to:

 Trading curb or circuit breaker, a stock market term
 Richie Hawtin (born 1970) alias Circuit Breaker, an electronic musician and DJ
 "Circuit Breaker", a song from Röyksopp's album The Understanding
 Circuit breaker design pattern, a design pattern in programming
 Circuit Breakers (video game), a 1998 racing video game
 Circuit Breaker, a superhero from the Transformers comics
 Circuit Breaker, a gadget blog on The Verge, an American technology news and media network
 Circuit Breaker, the name Singapore gave its partial lockdown during the COVID-19 pandemic, and subsequently adopted by other countries.